Alexander Emmanuilovich Borodyansky (born on 3 February 1944 in Vorkuta, Komi ASSR, Russian SFSR) is a Soviet and Russian screenwriter and film director.

Filmography
as screenwriter
 Afonya (1975)
 Dusha (1981)
 We Are from Jazz (1983)
 One Second for a Feat (1985)
 Courier (1986)
 Deja Vu (1988)
 The Assassin of the Tsar (1991)
 Those Old Love Letters (1992)
 American Daughter (1995)
 The Star (2002)
 Georg (2007)

External links

Biography of Alexander Borodyansky (in Russian)

1944 births
Living people
People from Vorkuta
Soviet screenwriters
20th-century Russian screenwriters
20th-century Russian male writers
Male screenwriters
Russian male writers
Russian film directors
Academicians of the National Academy of Motion Picture Arts and Sciences of Russia
Recipients of the Vasilyev Brothers State Prize of the RSFSR
State Prize of the Russian Federation laureates